Jesus Melchor "Boy" Vega Quitain (born January 6, 1945) is a Filipino lawyer who served as Chief Presidential Legal Counsel and Special Assistant under the Duterte administration. He is also serving as an Undersecretary in the Office of the President of the Philippines from 2016 to 2022.  He is reported to be the writer of most of President Rodrigo Duterte’s high-impact speeches, like his State of the Nation Addresses and inaugural speech.

Early life and career 
Jesus Quitain graduated from the San Beda College of Law in 1970. He is from Davao City. He joined Upsilon Sigma Phi in 1963.

Quitain engaged in private law practice since 1971. He also served in the academe as Dean of the College of Law of the University of Mindanao.

He was the first National President of the Association of Resident Ombudsman in Government Agencies and Former President of the Rotary Club of South Davao.

He is the father of Davao City Councilor Melchor “Jay” Quitain and Grace Quitain Pecson.

Public service 
Jesus Quitain joined the government in 2001 when then Davao City Mayor Rodrigo Duterte appointed him as City Legal Officer.

He also served in Davao City as Councilor of the First District, and as City Administrator. He was also the Former Resident Ombudsman of Davao City, for which he was awarded as Outstanding Resident Ombudsman of the Philippines for 2008.

Prior to his latest appointment as Chief Presidential Legal Counsel in 2021, Quitain served as the officer in charge of the Office of the Special Assistant to the President.

References 

1945 births
Living people
Filipino city and municipal councilors
20th-century Filipino lawyers
San Beda University alumni
21st-century Filipino politicians
Deans of law schools in the Philippines
People from Davao City
Duterte administration cabinet members
Advisers to the President of the Philippines